Ted Young (born November 12, 1960) is an American former professional basketball player who played for the Akita Isuzu Motors/Isuzu Lynx/Giga Cats of the Japan Basketball League.

Personal
His son, Teal Young plays baseball.

References

External links
College Stats
Vandy Photo
Vandy vs Ole Miss 1982 #31

1960 births
Living people
Akita Isuzu/Isuzu Motors Lynx/Giga Cats players
Basketball coaches from Tennessee
American expatriate basketball people in Japan
Basketball players from Tennessee
Centers (basketball)
High school basketball coaches in the United States
People from Clarksville, Tennessee
Vanderbilt Commodores men's basketball players
American men's basketball players